Freadelpha cinerea is a species of beetle in the family Cerambycidae. It was described by James Thomson in 1878.

Subspecies
 Freadelpha cinerea cinerea (Thomson, 1878)
 Freadelpha cinerea junodi Jordan, 1906

References

Sternotomini
Beetles described in 1878